Aloysius Murwito (born December 20, 1950) is a Roman Catholic priest and second Bishop of Agats in Indonesia.

The health problems of his predecessor Alphonsus Augustus Sowada, including a quadruple heart bypass in 1999, led to his retirement on May 9, 2001. Murwito succeeded him as Bishop of Agats in 2002.

References

External links

1950 births
Living people
21st-century Roman Catholic bishops in Indonesia
People from Sleman Regency